Gabriel Simeon (born 7 December 1971) is a former Grenadian sprinter who competed in the men's 100m competition at the 1992 Summer Olympics. He recorded an 11.10, not enough to qualify for the next round past the heats. His personal best is 10.64, set in 1992. In the 200m, he ran a 22.09.

References

1971 births
Living people
Grenadian male sprinters
Athletes (track and field) at the 1992 Summer Olympics
Olympic athletes of Grenada